Index Ventures is a European venture capital firm with dual headquarters in San Francisco and London, investing in technology-enabled companies with a focus on e-commerce, fintech, mobility, gaming, infrastructure/AI, and security. Since its founding in 1996, the firm has invested in a number of companies and raised approximately $5.6 billion.  Index Venture partners appear frequently on Forbes’ Midas List of the top tech investors in Europe and Israel.

History
Index Ventures has its origins in a Swiss bond-trading firm called Index Securities, founded by Gerald Rimer in 1976.
In 1992, Rimer recruited his son, Neil, to join the firm, and together they launched its technology investment arm, which would evolve into an independent entity, Index Ventures.

Index Ventures was officially founded in 1996 by Neil Rimer, David Rimer and Giuseppe Zocco, when they raised a pilot fund of $17 million, followed by a $180 million fund in 1998. Index Ventures began investing in Israel in 2003.  By 2005, Index's third fund raised 300 million euros; just two years later, it raised a further 350 million euros for its fourth found, which targeted to spend 15 to 20% on Israeli companies. The sixth fund raised 350 million euros from investors in 2012 and was targeted for European, U.S., and Israeli tech startups.

Index's seventh fund launched in 2017, raising 400 million from investors.  It was aimed at new companies in Europe, the U.S., and Israel.  In fact, by this time the company defined its focus as London, San Francisco, Berlin, New York, Stockholm, Tel Aviv and Paris.

From early on, the firm launched a life sciences practice, which in 2016 it spun off as an independent venture capital firm, Medicxi Ventures. Index Ventures' dual headquarters in San Francisco and London were opened in 2011 and 2002, respectively.

Partners
The firm's nine investment partners are Sarah Cannon, Mark Goldberg, Jan Hammer, Martin Mignot, Danny Rimer, Neil Rimer, Shardul Shah, Dominique Vidal, and Mike Volpi. The firm also has an operating partner, Bernard Dalle.

Awards

Danny Rimer was named to Fortune's "40 under 40" list in 2009, the Midas List of the top 25 deal makers in venture capital, and the New York Times' list of the top 20 venture capitalists from 2016 to 2018.

Neil Rimer was named the number one venture capitalist in Europe in Forbes' inaugural Midas List Europe 2017.

The 2018 Forbes' Global Midas List of the world's top venture capitalists featured Neil Rimer and Jan Hammer, and the 2018 New York Times list of the top venture capitalists worldwide featured four Index partners: Danny Rimer (number 17), Mike Volpi (number 34), Neil Rimer, and Jan Hammer.

Investments 

Index Ventures raised several venture funds, including Index Ventures I through VIII and Index Growth 1, 2 and 3. In 2018 the firm raised a total of $1.65 billion for an early-stage investment fund and a growth fund.

Examples include:

 Beamery
 Betfair, now Flutter Entertainment
Bird Company
 Blue Bottle Coffee (acquired by Nestlé for $425 million) 
 Criteo
CodeAcademy
 Dropbox
 Duo Security (being acquired by Cisco for $2.35 billion)
 Etsy
 Facebook
 IZettle (acquired by PayPal for $2.2bn)
 Just Eat
 King (held an initial public offering, subsequently acquired by Activision Blizzard for $5.9 billion)
 Last.fm (acquired by CBS for $280 million)
Moleskin
 MySQL (acquired by Sun Microsystems, now part of Oracle, for $1 billion)
 SCM Microsystems (now Identiv)
 Skype (acquired by eBay for $2.6 billion and later acquired by Microsoft for $8.5 billion).
 Sonos
 Supercell (acquired by Tencent for $8.6 billion)
 Trello (acquired by Atlassian for $425 million)
 Wiz
 Zendesk
 Zuora

Other investments include Adyen, Abacus.AI, Aurora, Citymapper, Deliveroo, Farfetch, Funding Circle, Gatsby, Intercom, Motorway, Notion, Patreon, Personio, Plaid, Revolut, Robinhood, Roblox, Ubiquity6, and Slack.

References

Further reading
 "Index Ventures Has Been on a Run. Now It’s Raising Funds to Keep It Up.", The New York Times, July 9, 2018.
 "One investing firm is behind a string of this year’s big money-making moments in Silicon Valley", recode, August 5, 2018.

External links
Index Ventures (company website)

Financial services companies established in 1996
Venture capital firms of the United States
Companies based in San Francisco
Venture capital firms of the United Kingdom